The Pacific Premier League (PPL) is a men's outdoor soccer league that was formed in 2015 consisting of men's amateur soccer clubs. The league is sanctioned by US Club Soccer, an affiliate of US Soccer. Clubs are eligible to compete in the US Open Cup through US Club Soccer qualification.

History 

Formed in 2015, the PPL is a regional soccer league based in Northern California. The founding member clubs included Chico City Rangers FC, CVU Blackhawks, Del Paso Phantoms FC, Glenn County FC Barnstormers, Reno-Tahoe Forest FC, and Yuba City FC Alliance.

The inaugural season was played in 2016 beginning in April and concluding with the PPL Cup championship in June. On June 11, 2016 Yuba City FC Alliance won the first-ever PPL Cup defeating Glenn County FC Barnstormers in the final 3-1. The championship match was played on the grounds of the Glenn County Fair in Orland, California.

Three new clubs were added for the 2017 season: Bay Area United, Redding Royals FC and Southern Oregon Starphire FC.

Clubs

Former member clubs 
 CVU Blackhawks (2016)
 Del Paso Phantoms FC (2016)
 Reno-Tahoe Forest FC (2016)

Champions

See also 
 Texas Premier Soccer League

References

External links 
 PPL official website
 US Club Soccer - Adult

Soccer leagues in the United States
2015 establishments in the United States
Sports leagues established in 2015